Guidio-Sarre is a village and seat of the commune of Deboye in the Cercle of Youwarou in the Mopti Region of southern-central Mali. The village lies on the northern shore of Lake Débo.

References

Populated places in Mopti Region